Events in the year 1769 in Norway.

Incumbents
Monarch: Christian VII

Events
15 August – The first census in Denmark-Norway to attempt completely covering all citizens (including women and children who had previously been listed only as numbers) takes place. At that point, Norway had 774,000 citizens.

Arts and literature

Births

8 January — Claus Pavels, bishop (died 1822)
25 February — Thomas Fasting, naval officer and government minister (died 1841)
14 April — Andreas Landmark, politician (died 1839)
4 May – Eilert Waldemar Preben Ramm, military officer and politician (d. 1837).
27 August – Hans Jacob Stabel, priest and politician (died 1836)

Deaths

24 February – Johan von Mangelsen, military officer and businessperson (born 1694).

See also

References